is a Japanese jazz pianist; she plays in the post-bop genre.

Early career
After studying at Berklee College of Music, Onishi moved to New York City, where she played with Joe Henderson, Betty Carter, Kenny Garrett, and Mingus Dynasty. She has also worked with Jackie McLean, Holly Cole, and Billy Higgins, among others, and recorded eight CDs for Blue Note (Somethin' Else in Japan) as a leader.

In May 1994, Junko Onishi played for a week at the Village Vanguard, with Wynton Marsalis's sidemen, bassist Reginald Veal, and drummer Herlin Riley.

Although she lists Duke Ellington, Thelonious Monk, and Ornette Coleman as her primary influences, her playing is also reminiscent of McCoy Tyner and contemporaries such as Kenny Kirkland and Mulgrew Miller.

Onishi appeared in the documentary Blue Note: A Story of Modern Jazz (1997), playing the song "Trinity" ("Quick") from her album Play, Piano, Play.

Hiatus and later career
Onishi stopped performing in the late 1990s, having chosen to study and practice. When Jaki Byard, her mentor at that time, died in 1999, she stopped playing completely for two years: "I felt like I lost everything; I felt like I didn't have any more mentors". She had to redevelop her technique when she decided to return, and started going to a gym to help her cope with the physical demands of playing.

Blue Note released her trio album, Musical Moments in 2009. Baroque (Verve), with Onishi leading a much larger group, followed a year later.

Discography

Albums as leader

Other recordings

References

External links 
 Official label website - verve music group
 
 JAZZDISCO.org Junko Onishi Catalog
 
 
 
 
 Junko Onishi - last.fm

1967 births
Living people
Japanese jazz pianists
Women jazz pianists
Japanese women pianists
Berklee College of Music alumni
Musicians from Kyoto Prefecture
21st-century pianists
21st-century Japanese women musicians
21st-century women pianists